Szydłów  (1936-1945: Goldmoor) is a village in the administrative district of Gmina Tułowice, within Opole County, Opole Voivodeship, in south-western Poland.

The village has a population of 500.

References

Villages in Opole County